Pedro Ávila Nevárez (12 March 1937 – 22 November 2020) was a Mexican politician affiliated with the Institutional Revolutionary Party. As of 2014 he served as Deputy of the LIX and LXI Legislatures of the Mexican Congress representing Durango. Nevárez died on 22 November 2020, in Durango City from COVID-19 complications.

References

1937 births
2020 deaths
Politicians from Durango
People from Durango City
Institutional Revolutionary Party politicians
21st-century Mexican politicians
20th-century Mexican politicians
Members of the Congress of Durango
Deaths from the COVID-19 pandemic in Mexico
Members of the Chamber of Deputies (Mexico) for Durango